Melhania dehnhardtii is a plant in the family Malvaceae. It is named for the German explorers Clemens and Gustav Denhardt.

Description
The flowers have bright yellow petals.

Distribution and habitat
Melhania dehnhardtii is endemic to Kenya's Kilifi District where it is known from fewer than five sites.

References

dehnhardtii
Endemic flora of Kenya
Plants described in 1899
Taxa named by Karl Moritz Schumann